Charles Angell Bradford  (1864–1940) was a British writer and historian.

Life
Charles was born in November 1864, the seventh child of Samuel and Sarah Bradford.

He passed an exam for the civil service in 1883.

He was elected a Fellow of the Royal Society of Literature in 1898 and was on their council from 1905.

In 1899 he was appointed as Assistant Superintendent in the Registry at the Home Office.

He was elected a Fellow of the Society of Antiquaries of London on 1 March 1900.

He died in February 1940 at the age of 75.

Bibliography
Eltham Palace (18??) 
On a window at Millom church (18??)
The Lady Well, Lewisham (1896) 
(2011 reprint) British Library, Historical Print Editions, pp30 
Trinity Hospital, Greenwich, and its Founder. (1899) Blackheath 
Of allegory (1907) London LCCN a45001152 
Ralph Rowlet, Goldsmith of London (1925) Kendal: T. Wilson & Son pp30 
The Life of the Rev. Joseph Bradford (1932) Hunger pp48 
Heart Burial (1933) London: George Allen & Unwin. pp256 LCCN 33031135 
(2005 reprint) 
(2012 reprint) 
William Dodington: a tragedy of St. Sepulchre's, Holborn, in 1600 (1933) London: 
Reprinted from Transactions of the London and Middlesex Archaeological Society, new series, vol. 3, part 1, 1933. pp9
Nicasius Yetsweirt [d. 1586]:Secretary for the French Tongue (1934) Hunger pp12 
Blanche Parry, Queen Elizabeth's Gentlewoman (1935) London : R.F. Hunger pp34 
The Conway Papers ... (1936) pp256 
Helena, Marchioness of Northampton (1936) London : G. Allen & Unwin, pp222 LCCN 36033726 
Christopher Dodington, a Patron of St. Sepulchre's Church, Holborn (1937) 
Sanctuary at St. Sepulchre's, Holborn, circa 1499 (1936) London: 
Rowland Vaughan, an Unknown Elizabethan (1937) Heron pp17 
Emanuel Lucar and St. Sepulchre, Holborn (1938) 
Hugh Morgan, Queen Elizabeth's Apothecary (1939) London : E. T. Heron & Co., pp30

References

External links
 AIM25 Archives in London
 Telegraph – heart burial

1864 births
1940 deaths
Fellows of the Royal Society of Literature
Fellows of the Society of Antiquaries of London
19th-century British writers
20th-century British writers